TADIL-J refers to the system of standardized J-series messages which are known by NATO as Link 16.  These are defined by U.S. military standard (MIL-STD) 6016.  It is used by the U.S. Navy, U.S. Army, U.S. Marine Corps, U.S. Air Force, U.S. Coast Guard, the NSA, several NATO countries, and Japan as part of the Multi-Tactical Data Link Network, a Tactical Data Link.

TADIL J was designed as an improved data link used to exchange near real-time (NRT) information. It is a communication, navigation, and identification system that supports information exchange between tactical command, control, communications, computers, and intelligence (C4I) systems.

The radio transmission and reception component of TADIL J is the Joint Tactical Information Distribution System (JTIDS) or its successor, the Multifunctional Information Distribution System (MIDS). These high-capacity, ultra high frequency (UHF), line of sight (LOS), frequency-hopping data communications terminals provide secure, jam-resistant voice and digital data exchange. JTIDS/MIDS terminals operate on the principle of time division multiple access (TDMA), wherein time slots are allocated among all TADIL J network participants for the transmission and reception of data. TDMA eliminates the requirement for a net control station (NCS) by providing a nodeless communications network architecture.

Other TADILs included TADIL-A, TADIL-B, and TADIL-C, which were known by NATO as Link 11, Link 11B, and Link 4 respectively.

J-series messages can also be exchanged over IP-based bearers using the NATO-defined SIMPLE protocol, JREAP and via satellite by S-TADIL J.

Change of terminology 
TADIL is no longer an official US Department of Defense term (per DISA guidance).  Instead it has officially been replaced by the generic term Tactical Data Link (TDL).  However, the term "TADIL" is a legacy holdover and still used in the vernacular.

See also
Tactical data link

References

Military equipment of NATO
Military radio systems